Joe Cardarelli (1944–1994) was a poet, painter, graduate of the Johns Hopkins Writing Seminars, and teacher of writing at the Maryland Institute College of Art for 27 years. Cardarelli pushed generations of MICA artists to incorporate writing into their creative repertoire, and regularly collaborated with his faculty colleagues on projects and performances. He is noted for establishing poetry series such as the Black Mountain poets, St. Valentine’s Day Poetry Marathon, and the Spectrum of Poetic Fire at MICA. In its 25th year, the Spectrum of Poetic Fire reading series still brings quality poets to MICA’s campus for readings during the academic year.

In his “Black Mountain Poets” series in 1983/84 he gathered material for a documentary video, Black Mountain Revisited — a historically invaluable collage of interviews and readings given by Robert Duncan, Robert Creeley, Edward Dorn, Joel Oppenheimer, and Jonathan Williams — in the case of Duncan and Oppenheimer, some of their last readings on record.  Over the years, Allen Ginsberg, Amiri Baraka, Ted Berrigan, Alice Notley, Anne Waldman, Maureen Owen, Ed Sanders, and many other representative writers of The New American Poetry were frequent visitors to the Institute — thanks to Joe Cardarelli.

Known as the “Godfather of Baltimore Poetry,” he died at the age of 50 in 1994.

A poem that Joe contributed to Andrei Codrescu’s and Laura Rosenthal’s anthology American Poets Say Goodbye to the Twentieth Century (New York, 4 Walls 8 Windows, 1996) ends with the following lines:

It’s too bad sometimes I think
too bad we can’t see the air
too bad the air’s invisible
too bad the air’s not clearly there
say as it is with just a little smoke
we’d find ourselves new eyes
taken up by the shapes of air tides
the multi-layered, striated, tunneled
twisted rolling wave shaped
moving patterns the air makes
no more or less substantial
than one hundred or thousand years.

Publications
 Phantom Pod, (Hollo, Joe Cardarelli, and Kirby Malone. Baltimore:  Pod Books, 1977.)
 The Maine Book – Selected Poems
 Black Mountain revisited. Cardarelli, Joe; Skipper, Jim; Maryland Institute, College of Art, and Viridian Productions, producers. [Baltimore, Md.]: Viridian Productions of the Maryland Institute, College of Art; 1990. 1 videocassette (54 min.)
 KUMQUAT #3 (Hewitt, Geof, Editor, Enosburg Falls, VT: Kumquat Press, 1971. 52 pp.)

External links 
 The Maine Book – Selected Poems by Joe Cardarelli
 Founder of Spectrum of Poetic Fire
 Anselm Hollo on Joe Cardarelli
 This Can Free
 Poetry in Baltimore
 Corvus by Anselm Hollo, includes Words for Joe Cardarelli
 CD of spoken word dedicated to Joe Cardarelli

1944 births
1994 deaths
20th-century American poets
Maryland Institute College of Art faculty
Poets from Maryland